Pavel Kryvitski (born April 17, 1984) is a male hammer thrower from Belarus. He set his personal best (80.67 metres) in the men's hammer throw event on August 11, 2011 in Minsk.

Doping ban
Kryvitski tested positive for growth hormones in 2015, and was subsequently given a four-year ban from sport.  The ban ends 10 June 2019. In addition all his results from 17 July 2012 to 16 July 2014 and since 11 May 2015 were annulled.

International competitions

References

1984 births
Living people
Belarusian male hammer throwers
Olympic athletes of Belarus
Athletes (track and field) at the 2012 Summer Olympics
World Athletics Championships athletes for Belarus
Belarusian sportspeople in doping cases
Doping cases in athletics